Ballarat Regional Tourism (trading as Visit Ballarat) is the separate, relatively autonomous tourism arm of the City of Ballarat. The board was created on January 27, 2011, to enable the local tourism sector to take ownership of destination promotion of Greater Ballarat.

The new organisation commenced operations on February 1, 2011, which is when it took over key tourism management responsibilities formerly handled by the Ballarat City Council. Responsibilities of the new tourism arm include promotion of Ballarat and surrounding areas as a tourist destination; providing visitor information through the Visitor Information Centre, and developing and attracting tourism and business events.

During its first year, the organisation was managed by a private sector board with the city council retaining ownership. On March 14, 2012, the city council voted to transfer Ballarat Regional Tourism's ownership to the private sector. The council will still continue to fund the board contingent on it meeting key performance indicators.

Ballarat's tourism industry generates $357 million annually in international and domestic spend, attracts 2.4 million visitors, and accounts for more than 2,200 local jobs.

Major Economic Impact Events
 Ballarat International Foto Biennale
 Mars Cycling Australia Road National Cycling Championships (15,000)
 Ballarat Beer Festival  
 Restaurant Ballarat 
 Ballarat Winter Festival 
 White Night

See also 
 Tourism in Australia

References

External links
Official website
City of Ballarat

Tourism in Victoria (Australia)
Ballarat
Tourism organisations in Australia